New York State Route 363 is a north–south state highway in Binghamton, New York, United States, that was established by 1981.

New York State Route 363 may also refer to:
New York State Route 363 (1930–1931) in Montgomery County
New York State Route 363 (1932–1950s) in Monroe County